Rajeev Siddhartha (born 11 April 1986) is an Indian actor. His work spans productions across film, television, theatre and digital web series. Siddhartha began his career in 2007 with the film Dil Dosti Etc and received critical acclaim as Romil in ALTBalaji's web series show Romil & Jugal in 2017.

Early life and education

Siddhartha was born in Dhanbad, Jharkhand, India on April 11, 1986. He spent his formative years in boarding schools in Mussoorie and Dehradun. He studied at The Doon School, Dehradun after which he went on to study Economics Honours from St. Stephen's College, Delhi. He is also an MBA graduate from Narsee Monjee Institute of Management and Higher Studies (NMIMS), Mumbai. Post his MBA Siddhartha worked for a year at an investment bank.

Career
Siddhartha acted in the film Dil Dosti Etc. whilst in college. After completing his MBA and working at an investment bank he took to the Mumbai theatre scene in 2011 with Lillete Dubey's Adhe Adhure. Mumbaitheatreguide.com praised his performance in the play stating that - "Rajeev Siddhartha plays the son to perfection, faithfully portraying the repressed angst of the character". Subsequently, he acted in the plays August Osage County, Wedding Album, The Dancing Donkey, Gauhar and The Merchant of Venice. His performance as Bassanio in the Merchant of Venice received mixed responses. His theatre experience has extended to Cineplays (an original Hotstar series) namely Adhe Adhure and Vijay Tendulkar's classics Khamosh Adalat Jaari Hai and Kanyadaan.

Simultaneously he has essayed roles in films and TV shows - he was one of the antagonists in Anil Kapoor's 24 that aired on Colours in 2013 He has also starred in Subhash Kapoor's Jolly LLB featuring Arshad Warsi and Boman Irani. In 2017, Siddhartha played Romil in the ALTBalaji's Romil and Jugal, a same sex love story. Bollywood Life praised both Siddhartha and his co-actor Manraj saying that "they prove their calibre as actors". He has subsequently acted in many web series including Four More Shots Please!, Hundred, Aashram, Marzi and the Netflix Original Film Upstarts.

Filmography

References

External links
 

Male actors from Uttarakhand
Living people
Indian male television actors
The Doon School alumni
St. Stephen's College, Delhi alumni
1986 births